Payam Sadeghian (born 29 February 1992) is a retired Iranian Footballer.

Club career

Zob Ahan
Sadeghian showed himself as a starting line-up player first time in 2011–12 IPL and made an assist for Mohammad Hosseini against Foolad. He also scored a goal and made another assist in a match against Malavan. On 9 September 2011, he made another assist for Esmaeil Farhadi against Persepolis. Two weeks later, he played the full 90 minutes against Shahin Bushehr and made an assist for Mohammad Ahmadpouri. He made an assist for Mohammad Ghazi on 2 October 2011 to show his assist ability another time.

Persepolis
He signed a two-year contract with Persepolis on 9 June 2013. He made his debut in a match against Tractor Sazi as a substitute for Gholamreza Rezaei and made an assist two minutes later for Mehdi Seyed Salehi. In his first season with Persepolis he was instrumental in their success and was one of their most important players. In August 2014 Sadegian was banned three months for shoving a referee during a match against Foolad.

He was fired by Persepolis on 27 April 2015 after a dispute with coach Branko Ivanković.

Naft Tehran
On 1 July 2015, Sadeghian joined Naft Tehran on a five-year contract. He scored his first goal for the club on 27 October 2015 in a 2–1 victory against Padideh.

Saba Qom
After falling out with the management at Naft, Sadeghian left the club and on 8 January 2016 he signed with Saba Qom and reunited with former coach Ali Daei.

Machine Sazi
On 28 May 2016, Sadeghian signed with newly promoted Tabrizi side Machine Sazi. This club also is his father's (Hassan Sadeghian) team. Sadeghian assisted in his first match for the club against Foolad.

Osmanlıspor
On 30 August 2017, Sadeghian signed a three–year contract with Turkish club Osmanlıspor. On 4 November 2017, Sadeghian made his first appearance for the club in a match against Fenerbahce, coming on as a second-half substitute and immediately contributing an assist. Sadeghian made his second appearance on 28 November 2017 in a Turkish Cup match, he played 85 minutes and recorded two assist. In his first five matches for the club, Payam recorded four assists. Three in the cup and one in the league.

Sadeghian scored his first goal for the club on 3 March 2018 from a penalty kick against Kasimpasa.

International career

Under-17

He captained the team to the championship for the first time in the 2008 AFC U-16 Championship. At the tournament he played in all the games apart from the final due to suspension. He scored Iran's first goal at the tournament against Bahrain. Winning the tournament qualified Iran for the 2009 FIFA U-17 World Cup, Sadeghian again scored Iran's first goal at the tournament against Gambia in the 44th minute making the most from a poorly taken free kick from the goalkeeper. He played a key role in Iran's qualification from its group, unbeaten with 7 points.

Under-20
He was again a vital part of Iran's U19's participation at the 2010 AFC U-19 Championship. He played in Iran's first two games, Iran losing both and failing to qualify from its group.

Under-22
He was called up by Ali Reza Mansourian to participate in the team's training camp in Italy. During a friendly match against the Italy B team he scored 2 goals in Iran's 6-2, including Iran's first with an outstanding free kick.

Senior
Sadeghian made his debut for the senior Iran team against Mozambique, as a substitute in 2012. He was called up again to the squad by Carlos Queiroz in March 2014, and played in Iran's match against Kuwait which Iran won 3-2.

Statistics

Club

International goals

U17

U23

Senior

Honours

Club
Zob Ahan
AFC Champions League Runner-up (1): 2010
Iran Pro League Runner-up (1): 2009–10

Persepolis
Iran Pro League Runner-up (1): 2013–14

International
Iran 
AFC U-16 Championship (1): 2008

Individual
Persian Gulf Pro League Top Assistant (1): 2013–14

References

External links 
Payam Sadeghian at PersianLeague.com
Payam Sadeghian at ffiri.ir

1992 births
Living people
Iranian footballers
Sportspeople from Tabriz
Zob Ahan Esfahan F.C. players
Persepolis F.C. players
Naft Tehran F.C. players
Saba players
Machine Sazi F.C. players
Ankaraspor footballers
Persian Gulf Pro League players
Süper Lig players
TFF First League players
Expatriate footballers in Turkey
Iranian expatriate sportspeople in Turkey
Iran under-20 international footballers
Iran international footballers
Association football forwards
Association football midfielders
Iranian expatriate footballers
Sepidrood Rasht players